The Student Basij (Persian: بسیج دانشجویی) (also known as "Student and Talabeh Basij") is considered among the "Islamic student organizations" which was founded based on the decree of the first/previous supreme leader of Iran, Seyyed Ruhollah Khomeini on 23 November 1988, with the scope of guardianship for the principles of revolution and Islam. Among its other goals are: inviting unity and likewise the solidarity between Hawza and university, establishment of a great Islamic government and victory of the world by Islam.

After declaration of this plan/decree by Ruhollah Khomeini, Supreme Council of the Cultural Revolution approved (the circumstances of) the mentioned plan; therefore, Tehran student Basij center became the responsible to found Basij offices at the universities --of Iran-- on 3 January 1991.

In regards to founding this organization, Seyyed Ruhollah Khomeini said that:

"Nowadays, the Basij of Student (of the university/Hawza) is regarded among the most essential formations. The students of the Hawzas and the universities ought to do their best to defend revolution and Islam --in the related centers; and my Basiji children --of Iran-- should be guard for the unchangeable principles of "Neither east nor west" in the aforesaid formations." He also added that: nowadays, universities and Hawzas need unity and solidarity more than everywhere. The children of the revolution never allow the accomplices of the U.S. and Soviet to have influence in the mentioned sensitive centers; and ...

Obligations 

There have been determined obligations for the student Basij -- to reach its scope(s) -- such as:

 Attraction, instruction and organizing volunteer students
 Introducing the culture of sacrifice and martyrdom for the students, and ...
 Protection and upgrade for the morale of being anti-arrogance in the students
 Holding the related needed ceremonies (memorials, conferences, etc.)
 Holding related courses, camps; also cultural, scientist and defensive classes
 Co-operation in researches expansion in the fields of culture/science/defense, in the direction of progress and building the country
And so forth.

Management 
"Mohammad Javad Nik-Ravesh" who is a member of Imam Hossein University scientific mission (and also had position at Imam Sadiq University), has been appointed as the head of the student basij --of the country-- on 23 December 2017. Likewsie, the commanders of the student Basij (since the start of this formation) are:

 Ali Gol-Parvar

 Seyyed Muhammad Husseini

 Ali Reza Varij-Kazemi

 Amir Reza Ahooan.

See also 

 Basij
 Hezbollah (Iran)
 Islamic Revolutionary Guard Corps

References

External links 
 Student Basij Organization forms jihadi groups to resolve issues
 Leader’s Speech to Basiji Students
 Organisations of the Iranian Revolution
Volunteer organizations
Islamic Revolutionary Guard Corps
1988 establishments in Iran